On the Road is a Chinese internet reality show. It was produced by Zhangxinyu and Lianghong. The show was released in June 2013 on Youku.

References

Chinese reality television series